Sekouba "Bambino" is the stage name of Sekouba Diabaté, a singer and musician born in Guinea, West Africa, in 1964.

Bambino was born and raised in the village of Kintinya, some 25 kilometers from the town of Siguiri, close to the border with Mali. He was born into a musical family, and is descended from a long line of griots, known in some Mande languages as jeli. His mother died when he was three years old, but left behind a legacy in the songs she had recorded which her son later heard on the radio. Her music became one of his main influences. Her death left Bambino with his father, who did not encourage his musical aspirations, hoping he would follow him working in his transport company, but from age eight, Bambino Diabaté sang with local bands and began to achieve musical renown. When he was 16, then-President Sékou Touré, (a music lover) who had heard him sing with local bands, insisted that he join Bembeya Jazz, Guinea's best-known musical group.

Thus, in  1983, at the age of 19, Diabaté was asked to join Bembeya Jazz, Guinea's best-known musical group.  He was given the nickname "Bambino" to distinguish him from one of the group's guitarists also named Sekou Diabaté (a.k.a. Sekou "Bembeya" a.k.a. "Diamond Fingers"). With Bembeya Jazz, the young vocalist undertook his first tour of Africa in 1985 and toured Europe the following year.

Sekouba Bambino released his first solo recording in 1991, and throughout the 1990s continued to record solo material as well as to sing with the African salsa group Africando. His 1994 album Syli nationale ("National Elephant"), was a homage to the Guinea national football team. His music is popular throughout West Africa, particularly in Guinea, Mali, and other countries where the Bambara and Malinke languages are spoken. He has become renowned for his vocal prowess, and his voice compares favorably with that of any of his home region's best male singers.  He is little known outside Africa, however, as he has consistently chosen to remain true to his West African fan base. His most recent album was released in 2004. His latest single was in 2008.

In November 2015 Bambino was caught up in an attack by suspected Ansar al-Din operatives on the Radisson Blu hotel in Mali's capital, Bamako, but was able to escape. The BBC quoted him telling journalists:

Discography

References

External links 
 
 
 Official website (in French)
 Review of Bambino, BBC

Guinean male singers
Living people
1964 births
Griots
People from Kankan Region